Cecil Sapp (born December 23, 1978) is a former American football fullback. He was signed by the Denver Broncos as an undrafted free agent in 2003. He played college football at Colorado State and was inducted into the Colorado State University Athletics Hall of Fame in 2017.

Sapp has also played for the Houston Texans and New York Sentinels.

Early years
Sapp graduated from Miami Palmetto Senior High School in 1998. He was born to Lesley Sapp and Jackie Warren.

External links
Colorado State Athletics Hall of Fame bio
Denver Broncos bio
Houston Texans bio
United Football League bio

1973 births
Living people
Miami Palmetto Senior High School alumni
Players of American football from Miami
American football fullbacks
Colorado State Rams football players
Denver Broncos players
Houston Texans players
New York Sentinels players